Brad Sihvon (January 29, 1971 – April 7, 2010) was a Canadian film and television actor.

Early life
Sihvon was born Arthur BradleySihvon in Niagara Falls, Ontario, Canada. Sihvon is in the Cinema of Canada, and has made appearances in American films. Sihvon has one brother Todd Sihvon and his mother Lynn Darrow.
He is the son of Roy Sihvon of Calgary, and grandson of Arthur William Sihvon, formerly deputy minister of Social Services for the Government of Saskatchewan and member of the Saskatchewan Sports Hall of Fame. His grandmother is Ruby Jean Dickson Sihvon, at one time a champion tennis player in Saskatchewan.

Career
Brad's career began in 1999, and he first made his movie debut in the Sci-Fi/Thriller movie The Man Who Used to Be Me which was released in 2000, then sometime in the 2000s, Sihvon had appeared in television series and movies including Halloween: Resurrection, The Snow Walker, White Noise, Severed: Forest of the Dead and finally Scary Movie 4. Sihvon has recently appeared in a film called Whisper and was released in 2007 and played the role of an 'tow truck driver'. It is known that Brad had minor roles in a few of his movies.

Personal life
Sihvon resided in Vancouver BC Canada and died on April 7, 2010 in Toronto, Canada.

Filmography

Cinema
The Man Who Used to Be Me (2000) (TV) - Delivery Guy
Christy: The Movie (2000) (TV) - unknown character
Hostage Negotiator (2001) - Nickey Larson
The Miracle of the Cards (2001) (TV) - Guinness Employee
Seeking Winonas (2001) - Bryan
Pressure (2002) - Norman the Cameraman
Dead in a Heartbeat (2002) (TV) - Communication Officer
Halloween: Resurrection (2002) - Charley Albans
Swimming Upstream (2002) (V) - Mitch
My Face: The Liam Penny Story (2002) - Ted Freeman
Firefight (2003) - Dean
The Snow Walker (2003) - Mr. Izzard
Stealing Christmas (2003) (TV) - Store Guard
White Noise (2005) - Minister
The Long Weekend (2005) - Mail Boy
Severed: Forest of the Dead (2005) - Tom
Clean Fight (2006) (TV) - Hank Campbell
Scary Movie 4 (2006) - 'His Brother, The Sheriff!'
My Baby Is Missing (2007) (TV) - Bendix
Whisper (2007) - Tow truck driver (final film role)

Television
These Arms of Mine (1999) (TV series) - unknown (1 episode)
Hollywood Off-Ramp (2000) (TV series) - Robert (1 episode)
Cold Squad (2001) (TV series) - David (1 episode)
Freedom (2001) (TV series) - unknown (1 episode)
The Sausage Factory (????) (TV series) - Lawyer (1 episode)
Special Unit 2 (2001) (TV series) - Jimmy Green (1 episode)
Rockpoint P.D. (2002) (TV series) - Media Relations Officer Phil (unknown episodes)
The Chris Isaak Show (2002) (TV series) - Waiter (1 episode)
My Guide to Becoming a Rock Star (????) (TV series) - Rob Hallerman (1 episode)
Taken (2002) (TV series) (unknown episodes)
The Twilight Zone (2002) (TV series) - Doyle Lipton (1 episode)
Dead Like Me (2003) (TV series) - Brett (1 episode)
Stargate SG-1 (2004) (TV series) - Joe (1 episode)
Huff (2004) (TV series) - Eric (1 episode)

External links
 
 Brad Sihvon at northernstars.ca

1971 births
2010 deaths
Canadian male film actors
Canadian male television actors
Male actors from Ontario
People from Niagara Falls, Ontario